The Battle of Diwaniya took place in Al Diwaniyah, 180 kilometers (111 mi) south of Baghdad, on 28 August 2006 between the Mahdi Army and the Iraqi Army.

The fighting erupted after coalition troops arrested a Sadr militia leader. The militia engaged in heavy street fighting with Iraqi soldiers which lasted late into the night. Militia fighters were entrenched in residential areas during the fighting. The Iraqi Army claims that most of its casualties occurred when Mahdi militiamen captured and executed a group of soldiers who had run out of ammunition. By next morning a ceasefire was in place with 23 Iraqi soldiers, 20 militiamen and 7 civilians killed.

About a month and a half later on 9 October 2006 another battle broke out in the city, this time between the militia and the U.S. Army. Thirty militiamen were killed and a U.S. military tank was severely damaged.

See also
Battle of Amarah
Operation Black Eagle
Operation Lion's Leap
U.S. Occupation of Iraq

References

Battles of the Iraq War involving Iraq
Battles of the Iraq War in 2006
August 2006 events in Asia